Maryline Desbiolles (born 21 May 1959 in Ugine, Savoie) is a French writer and winner of the Prix Femina, 1999, for Anchise.

References

1959 births
Living people
People from Savoie
French women novelists
20th-century French novelists
Writers from Auvergne-Rhône-Alpes
Prix Femina winners
20th-century French women writers